Bucculatrix fatigatella is a moth in the family Bucculatricidae. It was described by Carl von Heyden in 1863. It is found in the Alps.

References

Natural History Museum Lepidoptera generic names catalog

External links
 Images representing Bucculatrix fatigatella at Consortium for the Barcode of Life

Bucculatricidae
Moths described in 1863
Taxa named by Carl von Heyden
Moths of Europe
Leaf miners